Leninist League can refer to:

Leninist League (UK), an Oehlerite group.
Leninist League (US), a communist group which split from the Revolutionary Workers League (Oehlerite)

See also
Marxist-Leninist League (disambiguation)